When I Grow Up is a 1951 American drama film written and directed by Michael Kanin. The film stars Bobby Driscoll, Robert Preston, Martha Scott, Sherry Jackson, Johnny McGovern and Frances Chaney. The film was released on April 20, 1951, by United Artists.

Plot

Cast

Bobby Driscoll as Josh / Danny Reed
Robert Preston as Father Reed
Martha Scott as Mother Reed 
Sherry Jackson as Ruthie Reed
Johnny McGovern as Duckface Kelly
Frances Chaney as Mrs. Kelly
Poodles Hanneford as Bobo
Ralph Dumke as Carp
Paul Guilfoyle as Doc
Paul Levitt as Carp's Assistant
Griff Barnett as Dr. Bailey
Margaret Lloyd as Volunteer Nurse
Charley Grapewin as Grandpa Reed
Harry Morgan as Father Reed 
Elisabeth Fraser as Mother Reed 
Robert Hyatt as Binks 
Hamilton Camp as Bully
Ruth Lee as Bully's Mother
Donald Gordon as Harmonica Boy

References

External links
 

1951 films
American black-and-white films
United Artists films
1951 drama films
American drama films
Eagle-Lion Films films
Films scored by Jerome Moross
1950s English-language films
1950s American films